Igreja de Santa Clara is a church in Portugal. It is classified as a National Monument.

References 

 patrimoniocultural.gov.pt

Churches in Santarém District
National monuments in Santarém District